Roy Brain (2 September 1926 – 7 June 2006) was an Australian cricketer. He played two first-class matches for Tasmania between 1958 and 1959.

See also
 List of Tasmanian representative cricketers

References

External links
 

1926 births
2006 deaths
Australian cricketers
Tasmania cricketers
Cricketers from Hobart